

Utel (or Utellus; died ) was a medieval Bishop of Hereford. He was consecrated between 793 and 798 and died between 799 and 801.

Citations

References

External links
 

Bishops of Hereford
8th-century English bishops
Year of birth unknown
800s deaths